A multicenter research trial is a clinical trial conducted at more than one medical center or clinic. Most large clinical trials, particularly Phase III trials, are conducted at several clinical research centers.

Benefits
The benefits of multicenter trials include a larger number of participants, different geographic locations, the possibility of inclusion of a wider range of population groups, and the ability to compare results among centers, all of which increase the generalizability of the study.  In many cases, efficacy will vary significantly between population groups with different genetic, environmental, and ethnic or cultural backgrounds ("demographic" factors); normally only geographically dispersed trials can properly evaluate this.

External links 
ClinicalTrials.gov from US National Library of Medicine
Role of ICH GCP and Recruitment Strategies Training of Clinical Sites Staff in Successful Patient Recruitment Rates By Marithea Goberville, Ph.D.
IBPA Publications 2005

Clinical research
Pharmaceutical industry
Clinical trials